Bartolomé Ángel Venancio Alberto Vaccarezza (1886–1959) was an Argentine poet and playwright.

Vaccarezza was born in Buenos Aires on April 1, 1886. He is usually credited as the foremost exponent of the sainete genre, having written its most popular play, El Conventillo de La Paloma (The La Paloma Tenement). He was a friend and collaborator of Carlos Gardel, and pronounced his eulogy when Gardel was interred at La Chacarita Cemetery.

Besides his literary activities, he presided over Argentores (the national playwright guild) and  Casa del Teatro (House of Theater, a beneficent organization that hosts impoverished retired actors).

He died in Buenos Aires, on August 6, 1959.

Works

Sainete
Cuando un pobre se divierte
El conventillo de La Paloma
Tu cuna fue un conventillo
La comparsa se despide (1932)
Los scruchantes (1911)
El juzgado (1903, his first play)

Poetry - Tango Lyrics
La copa del olvido
Araca, corazón
Otario que andás penando
Eche otra copa pulpero
No me tires con la tapa de la olla
Pobre gringo
Virgencita del Talar

Film Scripts
El conventillo de La Paloma (1936)
Lo que le pasó a Reynoso (1937 y 1955)
Viento norte (1937)
Murió el sargento Laprida (1937)
El cabo Rivero (1938)
Pampa y cielo (1938)
El comisario de Tranco Largo (1942)
Sendas cruzadas (1942)

External links

Short Biography (English)
Biography  (Spanish)
Vacarezza at Info-Almagro (Spanish)

1886 births
1959 deaths
People from Buenos Aires
Argentine people of Italian descent
Argentine dramatists and playwrights
Burials at La Chacarita Cemetery
20th-century dramatists and playwrights